Peter Block (1933 - December 13, 2015) was a co-founder and former-owner of the National Hockey League's Pittsburgh Penguins. He was a part of the team's ownership for just one season, selling in his share in 1968. Block rejoined the ownership group in 1971, though, and kept his stake until the team went bankrupt in 1975. He relocated to California in the mid-1980s to start a business venture and died on December 13, 2015 at his home in Santa Monica from cancer.

Pittsburgh Penguins
Block and Jack McGregor, a Republican Pennsylvania State Senator from Pittsburgh, came up with the idea for the club in 1965, during a car trip along the Pennsylvania Turnpike when they heard the NHL planned to expand from six to 12 teams. Block stated to McGregor that in order for Pittsburgh to be a true sports town, in needed to have an NHL team. The two men, who were classmates at the University of Pittsburgh School of Law, gathered together a group of investors, that included HJ Heinz II, Art Rooney, and Richard Scaife, and made their successful proposal to the NHL. Pittsburgh was awarded a franchise and McGregor and Block each owned a 12.5 percent share of the team. According to McGregor, Block initially laughed to him for McGregor's wife, Carol, coming up with the name "Penguins". Block argued against the name and favored naming the club the Hornets, from Pittsburgh's long-time and successful affiliate in the American Hockey League.

Block, and several other Penguins' investors, also purchased a second professional franchise in 1967, the Pittsburgh Phantoms, a  soccer team in the non-FIFA sanctioned National Professional Soccer League. The club played for just one season folded before the 1968 NASL season due to poor attendance, drawing only an average of 3,122. The Phantoms' financial losses also tapped out Block and many of the Penguins' investors.

Aside from his ownership duties, Block was also the team's vice president and chief operating officer during the season. At end of the team's inaugural season, Block relinquished his share in the team. However he rejoined the ownership group in 1971. During his ownership tenure, Block would bring his stepchildren to the team Christmas party, and his wife, Ida, even gave guitar lessons to former Penguins winger Bob "Battleship" Kelly.

At the end of the Penguins' 1974-75 season, the team filed for bankruptcy. The ownership group had been negotiating a plan to keep the team while beginning to pay $532,000 in overdue withholding taxes, however a local management change in the team. On June 12, 1975, IRS agents walked into the Pittsburgh Civic Arena and placed a tax lien against the Penguins. Meanwhile Equibank, the Penguins' largest creditor, had filed a $5 million suit against the club. Penguins were eventually sold for a mere $3.8 million to a group that included Wren Blair, ending Block's stake in the team. When the Penguins declared bankruptcy again in the late 1990s, Block expressed hope that the Pens would be rescued stating "It's very, very scary to see this happening to the Penguins again, after all, it was my idea and I want to see it succeed forever".

Personal
Block was survived by his wife, Donna, and their daughter, Jennifer. He was also survived by his ex-wife Ida and three stepchildren.

References

1933 births
2015 deaths
Sportspeople from Pittsburgh
Pittsburgh Penguins executives
Pittsburgh Penguins owners
University of Pittsburgh School of Law alumni